Lake Nzilo (formerly Lake Delcommune, also Lac del Commune) is a reservoir formed by a hydroelectric dam on the Lualaba River in the Haut-Lomami Province of the southern Democratic Republic of the Congo. 

The reservoir was originally named after the Belgian soldier and explorer Alexandre Delcommune.

Dam

The  dam with hydroelectric power plant was built to provide power for copper mining operations.

The infrastructure of this plant is four units and has a design capacity of 100MW. The last unit was commissioned in 1953. It is currently operated by SNEL (Societe Nationale d'Electricite).

Reservoir
The reservoir also provides a source of water for these operations.

The site was an area of wetlands along the Lualaba River before it was dammed. Some of the habitat around the lake is swamps.

It has been stocked with fish, and is now an important site for waterbirds.

Pollution and recreation

Although the lake is visibly polluted by the effluent from a copper mine, schistosomiasis seems to thrive and a number of infections have been reported.

As of 2007 the lake was popular with the expatriate community for weekend water sports.

References

Nzilo
Haut-Lomami
Nzilo